CloudSim is a framework for modeling and simulation of cloud computing infrastructures and services. Originally built primarily at the Cloud Computing and Distributed Systems (CLOUDS) Laboratory, the University of Melbourne, Australia, CloudSim has become one of the most popular open source cloud simulators in the research and academia. CloudSim is completely written in Java. The latest version of CloudSim is CloudSim v6.0.0-beta on GitHub

CloudSim extensions
Initially developed as a stand-alone cloud simulator, CloudSim has further been extended by independent researchers.

 CloudSim Plus is a totally re-engineered CloudSim fork providing general-purpose cloud computing simulation and exclusive features such as: multi-cloud simulations, vertical and horizontal VM scaling, host fault injection and recovery, joint power- and network-aware simulations and more.
 Though CloudSim itself does not have a graphical user interface, extensions such as CloudReports offer a GUI for CloudSim simulations.
 CloudSimEx extends CloudSim by adding MapReduce simulation capabilities and parallel simulations.
 Cloud2Sim extends CloudSim to execute on multiple distributed servers, by leveraging Hazelcast distributed execution framework.
RECAP DES extends the CloudSim Plus framework to model synchronous hierarchical architectures (such as ElasticSearch).
ThermoSim extends CloudSim toolkit by incorporating thermal characteristics and uses Deep learning-based temperature predictor for cloud nodes.

References

External links
 

Scientific simulation software
Cloud computing
Cloud infrastructure
Cloud platforms